God Is My Partner is a 1957 American drama film directed by William F. Claxton and written by Charles F. Royal. The film stars Walter Brennan, John Hoyt, Marion Ross, Jesse White, Nelson Leigh and Charles Lane. The film was released in July 1957, by 20th Century Fox. It cost $150,000 and returned more than $750,000.

Plot

Cast
 Walter Brennan as Dr. Charles Grayson 
 John Hoyt as Gordon Palmer
 Marion Ross as Frances Denning
 Jesse White as Louis 'The Lump' Lumpkin
 Nelson Leigh as Rev. William Goodwin
 Charles Lane as Judge Warner
 Ellen Corby as Mrs. Dalton
 Paul Cavanagh as Dr. James Brady
 Nancy Kulp as Maxine Spelvana
 John Harmon as 'Long Shot' Ben Renson
 Lyle Talbot as Dr. Warburton 
 Charles H. Gray as  Ross Newman
 Gloria Blondell as  Tree Critic / Wife
 Edgar Dearing as Mike Malone

References

External links
 

1957 films
20th Century Fox films
American drama films
1957 drama films
Films scored by Paul Dunlap
Films directed by William F. Claxton
1950s English-language films
1950s American films